Further Adventures of Lucky Jim or The New Adventures of Lucky Jim is a comedy television series which first aired on BBC 1 in 1967. Inspired by the novel Lucky Jim by Kingsley Amis, it updates the story from the early 1950s of the novel to mid-1960s Swinging London. It stars Keith Barron as the young university lecturer Jim Dixon. The scriptwriters wrote a belated sequel The Further Adventures of Lucky Jim starring Enn Reitel in 1982.

The majority of the episodes are now considered lost.

Other actors who appeared in the series include Suzy Kendall, Nerys Hughes, John Le Mesurier, Francis Matthews, Eunice Gayson, John Junkin, Donald Hewlett, William Kendall, Robert Raglan, Felix Bowness, Janina Faye, Patrick Newell, Diana King and Michael Balfour.

Main cast
 Keith Barron as Jim Dixon
 Colin Jeavons as Brian

References

Bibliography
 David Pringle. Imaginary People: A Who's who of Fictional Characters from the Eighteenth Century to the Present Day. Scolar Press, 1996.

External links
 

BBC television sitcoms
1967 British television series debuts
1967 British television series endings
1960s British comedy television series
English-language television shows